George Milford Harding (1827–1910) was an American architect who practiced in nineteenth-century Massachusetts, New Hampshire, and Maine.

Life and career

Harding was born in 1827 in Chatham, Massachusetts.  At the age of 17 he began his studies at the Lowell Institute in Boston, probably working in the office of a local architect as well.

In 1851, Harding established a partnership with Thomas W. Silloway.  Silloway & Harding was dissolved by April, 1853, and both established private offices.  Harding soon set his sights on northern New England, and was practicing in Concord, New Hampshire by 1854.  By 1856 he was in Manchester.  In 1858, he moved to Portland, Maine.  It would also appear that for a time in the late 1860s he was employed as State Architect, and worked on a proposal for an expansion of the State House. He remained there until 1873, when he returned to Boston, though he continued to receive commissions to design buildings in Maine.

In the 1880s he relocated his office to Hyde Park, which was annexed to Boston in 1912.

Legacy
Harding was one of several architects to rebuild important sections of downtown Portland after the fire of 1866. However, most of his work was made up of private residences and a large number of school buildings.

He was the teacher of several other architects, including Henry M. Francis of Fitchburg, Massachusetts and Charles H. Kimball, also of Portland.

A number of his works are listed on the U.S. National Register of Historic Places.

thumb

Architectural works

References

1827 births
1910 deaths
Architects from Massachusetts
Architects from Boston
Architects from New Hampshire
Architects from Portland, Maine
19th-century American architects
People from Chatham, Massachusetts